is a 1948 Japanese yakuza film directed by Akira Kurosawa. It is notable for being the first of sixteen film collaborations between director Kurosawa and actor Toshiro Mifune.

Plot 
Sanada (Takashi Shimura) is an alcoholic doctor (the titular "drunken angel") in postwar Japan who treats a small-time yakuza named Matsunaga (Toshiro Mifune) after a gunfight with a rival syndicate. The doctor, noticing that Matsunaga is coughing, diagnoses the young gangster with tuberculosis. After frequently pestering Matsunaga, who refuses to deal with his illness, about the need to start taking care of himself, the gangster finally agrees to quit boozing and womanizing and allow Sanada to care for him. The two enjoy an uneasy friendship until Matsunaga's sworn brother, Okada, who is also the abusive ex-boyfriend of the doctor's female assistant Miyo, is released from prison. In the meantime, Sanada continues treating his other patients, one of whom, a young female student, seems to be making progress against her tuberculosis.

Matsunaga quickly succumbs to peer pressure and stops following the doctor's advice, slipping back into old drinking habits and going to nightclubs with Okada and his fellow yakuza. Eventually, he collapses during a heated dice game and is taken to Sanada's clinic for the evening. Okada shows up and threatens to kill the doctor if he doesn't tell him where to find Miyo, and while Matsunaga stands up for the doctor and gets Okada to leave, he realizes that his sworn brother cannot be trusted. Matsunaga then finds out that the boss of his syndicate, who gave him control of Okada's territory during his time in prison, intends to sacrifice him as a pawn in the war against the rival syndicate. Okada also orders the storeowners in his territory to refuse service to Matsunaga as retaliation for challenging him.

Sanada goes to report Okada's harassment to the police, while Matsunaga discreetly leaves the clinic and goes to the yakuza's apartment. There, he finds his sworn brother with Nanae, Matsunaga's former sweetheart who abandoned him due to his failing health, and angrily tries to stab him before starting to cough up blood. Okada then stabs him in the chest, and Matsunaga stumbles outside before dying of his wounds. Okada is arrested for the murder, but Matsunaga's boss refuses to pay for his funeral. A local barmaid, who had feelings for Matsunaga, pays for it instead and tells Sanada that she plans to take Matsunaga's ashes to be buried on her father's ranch, where she had offered to live with him. The doctor retorts that while he understands how she feels, he cannot forgive Matsunaga for throwing his life away. Just then, his patient, the female student, arrives and reveals that her tuberculosis is cured and the doctor happily leads her to the market for a celebratory sweet.

Cast

Production
While looking for an actor to play Matsunaga, Kurosawa was told by one of the casting directors about Mifune, who was auditioning for another movie where he had to play an angry character. Kurosawa watched Mifune do this audition, and was so amazed by Mifune that he cast him as Matsunaga. On the film's Criterion Collection DVD, Japanese-film scholar Donald Richie comments that Kurosawa was impressed by the athletic agility and "cat-like" moves of Mifune, which also had bearing in his casting.

Censorship issues in Drunken Angel are covered extensively in a supplemental documentary by Danish film scholar Lars-Martin Sorensen, created for the Criterion Collection DVD release of the film, entitled Kurosawa and the Censors. Produced and released during the American occupation in Japan, the Drunken Angel screenplay had to comply with a censorship board issued by the U.S. government. The board did not allow criticism of the occupation to be shown in Japanese films at that time.

Kurosawa slipped several references to the occupation, all of them negative, past the censors. The opening scene of the film features unlicensed prostitutes known as "pan pan" girls, who catered to American soldiers. The gangsters and their girlfriends all wear Westernized clothing and hairstyles. Kurosawa was not allowed to show a burned-out building in his black-market slum set, but he did heavily feature the poisonous bog at the center of the district. English-language signage was also not allowed, but the markets on set have several examples of English usage on their signs. The dance scene in the nightclub features an original composition ("Jungle Boogie", sung by Shizuko Kasagi) with lyrics by Kurosawa, satirizing American jazz music; Kasagi imitates Johnny Weissmuller's famous yell from the Tarzan movies, and the way Kurosawa frames the singer parodies the American film noir movie Gilda. The censorship board was unable to catch these subtle breaches due to overwork and understaffing, but censors did require Kurosawa to rewrite the film's original, more "gruesome" ending.

Music
Kurosawa used music to provide contrast with the content of a given scene. In particular was his use of The Cuckoo Waltz by J. E. Jonasson. During filming, Kurosawa's father died. While he was in a sad state, he heard The Cuckoo Waltz playing in the background, and the whimsical music made him even more depressed.

Kurosawa decided to use this same effect in the film, at the low point in the life of Matsunaga, when the character realizes that he was being used all along by the crime boss. Kurosawa had the sound crew find the exact recording of The Cuckoo Waltz that he had heard after his father died, and had them play the instrumental beginning of the song repeatedly for the scene in which Matsunaga walks down the street after leaving the crime boss. Kurosawa also wanted to use, in the opening scene for Okada, to have him perform on guitar "Mack the Knife", originally "Die Moritat von Mackie Messer" which was a song composed by Kurt Weill with lyrics by Bertolt Brecht for their music drama Die Dreigroschenoper, but the studio could not afford the rights to the song.

Legacy
Drunken Angel has a 93% approval rating on Rotten Tomatoes. In The Yakuza Movie Book: A Guide to Japanese Gangster Films (2003), Mark Schilling cited the film as the first to depict post-war yakuza, although he noted the movie tends to play off the yakuza film genre's common themes rather than depict them straightforwardly.

References

External links

Movie sources

 Drunken Angel - Japanese With English Subtitles, online video (1 hour, 38 minutes, 14 seconds), at Archive.org

Reviews

 
 
 
 DVD Review: BFI - Region 2 - PAL
Essay by Jay Carr at Turner Classic Movies

Commentary

Drunken Angel: The Spoils of War an essay by Ian Buruma at the Criterion Collection

1948 films
1948 drama films
Japanese drama films
1940s Japanese-language films
Japanese black-and-white films
Yakuza films
Medical-themed films
Best Film Kinema Junpo Award winners
Toho films
Films directed by Akira Kurosawa
Films produced by Sōjirō Motoki
Films with screenplays by Akira Kurosawa
Films scored by Fumio Hayasaka
Films about alcoholism
Films about physicians
Films about tuberculosis